Dhamaka is a 2020 Indian Malayalam-language comedy film directed by Omar Lulu and written by Sarang Jayaprakash, Venu O. V. and Kiran Lal from a story by Lulu. The film stars Arun Kumar, Dharmajan Bolgatty, and Nikki Galrani, with Hareesh Kanaran, Mukesh, Urvashi, and Innocent in supporting roles. The film has music composed by Gopi Sundar. The plot follows Eyo (Arun) and his search for remedies after finding out that he has erectile dysfunction on his wedding night.

Plot
Eyo is bad in studies and all that he does is fooling around with his friend Siva. As Eyo's father is sure that his son is never going to achieve anything in life and he himself is having a cash crunch, he wants his son to marry Annie, a wealthy divorcée. After a series of jokes about her being divorced, Eyo is smitten by her charm when he sees her. Their marriage happens soon after. As Annie had challenged her ex-husband saying she will marry a younger man and have a baby in the tenth month, she is in a hurry to have a child.

But as it turns out, Eyo is unable to “prove his manliness on bed”, as he explains it later to Dr. Saxena, a sexologist who is also an expert on IVF. The “Tsunami mix” given by the doctor to boost the boy's sexual urge is mistakenly taken by Eyo's father and his mother becomes pregnant. This is disliked by Eyo and Annie as it is a shame for him to be a brother at the age he is supposed to be a father. He and Annie is now in a hurry to have  a child so he again meets Saxena he puts forward the idea of IVF as a remedy. They both agree on the same.

One day in dads absence it is Eyo who takes his mother for checkup to a government college. Eyo's mother mentions about his sons problem to a doctor who advises and make him aware of the fraud activities by such unethical doctors like Saxena. Doctor asks him to go for  a honeymoon and take their own time. Happy Eyo calls doctor to thank him for both his medicine and advice that helped him in the bed it is revealed that the medicine was mere vitamins given by the doctor just to boost Eyo's confidence. After a  few months it is shown that in a happy baby shower the entire family rejoice  the arrival of new guests.

Cast 

Arun A. Kumar as Eyo Pauly
Dharmajan Bolgatty as Shiva, Eyo's friend
Nikki Galrani as Annie / Ann Maria, Eyo's wife
Hareesh Kanaran as Dr. Sexena / Biju
Mukesh as Pauly
Urvashi as Annamma Pauly
Innocent as Pauly's father
Sabumon Abdusamad as Britto, Annie's first husband
Edavela Babu as Annie's father
Shaalin Zoya as Pinky, Eyo's sister
Salim Kumar as Dr. Gopinath
Sooraj Thelakkad as Britto's bodyguard
 Neha Saxena as Thresia
 Michelle Ann Daniel as Maggie
 Saraf Sabith as Friend at Pataya Hotel
 Ponnamma Babu as Valyammachi
 Kalabhavan Haneef
 Molly Kannamaly as Maria Chedathi
 Sabith Shajahan as Annie's brother
 Binu Adimaly as Family Court advocate
 Pareekutty as Advocate clerk
Noorin Shereef as dancer in "Adipoly Dhamaka"
Omar Lulu as a dancer in "Adipoly Dhamaka"
Fukru as a dancer in "Adipoly Dhamaka"

Production 
Arun, who played a role as a child artist in Olympiyan Anthony Adam, was roped in to play the lead role. The film is directed by Omar Lulu of Oru Adaar Love fame.

Release 
The film was initially scheduled to release on 28 November before the release date was pushed to 2 January.

Critical reception 

The Times of India gave the film 3 out of 5 stars stating that "The film considers issues like quick-fix solutions, ageism and also our language, and calls for a rethinking on these". Cinema Express gave the film a rating of one-and-a-half out of five stars and wrote that "The movie's ideas seem to have been inspired by the dirty jokes and trolls on social media which come from the imagination of teenagers".

Sajin Shrijith of Cinema Express rated the movie 1.5 out of 5 and wrote "After Oru Adaar Love, Omar Lulu returns with Dhamaka, another movie that gives tough competition to the former in the patience-testing department. I can't tell which of the two is more potent in that regard. The movie's ideas seem to have been inspired by the dirty jokes and trolls on social media which come from the imagination of teenagers. With one cringe-inducing scene (and song) after the other, Dhamaka continually assaults our senses. And just like his previous movies, Omar takes tunes from popular Malayalam flicks and use them for “explosive” moments in his film. The awkwardness generated is so high that one wishes for Harry Potter's invisibility cloak."

Sify called it a "lowbrow comedy".

Soundtrack
The music and background score of the film were composed by Gopi Sundar.
Track list 
1- "Kandittum Kanatha" -Bleslee(BigBoss Malayalam 1st RunnerUp)

2- "Potti Potti" - Gopi Sundar

3- "Happy Happy Nammal" - Gopi Sundar, Afsal, Sithara, Swetha Ashok, Sachin Raj, Aswin Vijayan

4- "Kattumundedye" - Vidhu Prathap

5- "Ee Ventheeram" - Najim Arshad

6- "Vazhikattum" - Najim Arshad

7- "Kattumundedye" - Pranavam Shashi

8- "Adipoli Dhamaka" - Sayanora Philip, Swetha Ashok, Akbar Khan, Nanda J Devan

References

External links 
 

2020s Malayalam-language films
Indian comedy films
2020 comedy films
Films directed by Omar Lulu